The siege of Kōriyama Castle was fought in the year 1544. The Iriki were vassals of the Shimazu clan and Iriki-In Shigetomo was the brother-in-law of Shimazu Takahisa. However relations began to sour when rumors spread that Shigetomo was plotting a rebellion against Takahisa. In 1544 Shigetomo died and shortly after Takahisa attacked and captured his castle of Kōriyama, ending any menace the Iriki-in could pose to his rule. Iriki-in Shigetsugu succeeded Shigetomo and the relations were later restored between both sides.

Battles of the Sengoku period
1544 in Japan
Shimazu clan
Sieges involving Japan
Conflicts in 1544